The Caledonian Railway 49 Class and 903 Class were 4-6-0 express passenger locomotives designed by John F. McIntosh and built at the Caledonian Railway's own St. Rollox Works in 1903 and 1906 respectively.

49 Class

In 1903, the Caledonian Railway had no passenger locomotives larger than 4-4-0s, and the heaviest trains over its main line between Glasgow and Carlisle required to be double headed, even in the less demanding southbound ('up') direction. Northbound ('down') trains also required banking assistance on the climb to Beattock Summit. In an effort to avoid these requirements, McIntosh designed a large 4-6-0 based on his 'Dunalastair' series of 4-4-0s. Two locomotives were built in 1903, and immediately became the Caledonian's flagship locomotives. Nonetheless, their performance did not live up to expectations, and it was soon clear that banking assistance was still required over Beattock. Until 1906 the Caledonian railway had no turntables long enough for the 49 Class, and arrangements for turning them included use of the Cathcart Circle or turning locomotive and tender separately.

903 Class
By 1906, experience with the 49 Class had enabled McIntosh to design an improved version, and the installation of new turntables at major engine sheds presaged the arrival of five new locomotives. The first of these, number 903, was named "Cardean" after the country estate of one of the CR directors, and immediately became the company's new flagship locomotive, with its name becoming a nickname for the whole class. The Caledonian gave the new locomotives a great deal of publicity and "Cardean" thus achieved some fame. Even so, the performance of the 903s was still unremarkable.

Rebuilding and subsequent service
Neither class was equipped with superheating when built, but all seven locomotives were rebuilt with Schmidt superheaters and new cylinders during 1911. These modifications reduced coal consumption but made little difference to the locomotives' performance, and McIntosh built no more large passenger 4-6-0s (although he did build smaller 4-6-0s for goods traffic). His successor William Pickersgill had no greater success with his sluggish outside-cylindered 60 Class or the disastrous three-cylinder 956 Class, so the Caledonian Railway continued to rely heavily upon 4-4-0s for express passenger traffic until the Grouping.

One 903 class locomotive was withdrawn in 1915 due to accident damage, but the other six locomotives passed to the London, Midland and Scottish Railway in 1923. The two 49 class locomotives were extensively renewed around 1924 with new frames and cylinders, but all of the Caledonian passenger 4-6-0s were quickly eclipsed by new LMS Compound 4-4-0 and Royal Scot 4-6-0s. The four surviving 903s were withdrawn in 1927–30, whilst the two 49s lasted until 1933. All were scrapped.

Accidents and incidents
A few passengers suffered minor injuries.

On 22 May 1915, locomotive No. 907 was hauling a local passenger train involved in Britain's worst ever railway accident, the double collision and fire at Quintinshill, Dumfriesshire in which at least 226 people were killed. The locomotive was taken to St Rollox works to be repaired, but due to the extent of the damage its rebuilding was abandoned and 907 was withdrawn and scrapped.

Numbering and locomotive histories

See also 
 Locomotives of the Caledonian Railway

References 

 http://www.uqp.de/kopka/europa/uk/cardean.htm 

https://archive.org/stream/railwaylocomotiv20newy#page/11/mode/1up
https://archive.org/stream/railwaylocomotiv20newy#page/12/mode/1up 

049
4-6-0 locomotives
Railway locomotives introduced in 1903
Railway locomotives introduced in 1906
Scrapped locomotives
Standard gauge steam locomotives of Great Britain